Akyar is the name of several rural localities in the Republic of Bashkortostan, Russia:
Akyar, Khaybullinsky District, Republic of Bashkortostan, a selo in Akyarsky Selsoviet of Khaybullinsky District
Akyar, Miyakinsky District, Republic of Bashkortostan, a village in Kacheganovsky Selsoviet of Miyakinsky District